PNS Shamsheer or PNS Shamsher also sometimes PNS Shamshir, meaning "sword", may refer to the following ships of Pakistan Navy:

 , the former British  Type 12 frigate HMS Diomede (F16); acquired by the Pakistan Navy in July 1988
 , is  built by Hudong-Zhonghua Shipyard in China; commissioned by the Pakistan Navy in January 2010

See also
  of the Iranian Navy
 Shamshir (disambiguation)

Frigates of Pakistan
Pakistan Navy ship names